Gaffney Commercial Historic District national historic district located at Gaffney, Cherokee County, South Carolina. The district encompasses 41 contributing building in the central business district of Gaffney.  Most of the buildings were built after 1900 and before 1930 and are primarily commercial buildings in vernacular commercial interpretations of the Italianate, Romanesque Revival, Renaissance Revival, Art Deco, and Neoclassical styles. All of the buildings are of brick construction and vary from one to four stories in height. The downtown area, which continues to be a center of Gaffney commerce, retains much of its early 20th century character.

It was listed on the National Register of Historic Places in 1986.

References

Commercial buildings on the National Register of Historic Places in South Carolina
Historic districts on the National Register of Historic Places in South Carolina
Italianate architecture in South Carolina
Romanesque Revival architecture in South Carolina
Neoclassical architecture in South Carolina
Buildings and structures in Cherokee County, South Carolina
National Register of Historic Places in Cherokee County, South Carolina
Gaffney, South Carolina